Richard Frothingham Jr. (January 31, 1812 – January 29, 1880) was a Massachusetts historian, journalist,  and politician.  Frothingham was a proprietor and managing editor of The Boston Post. He also served in the Massachusetts House of Representatives, and as the second mayor of  Charlestown, Massachusetts, United States.

Early life
Frothingham was born in Charlestown, Massachusetts to Richard and Mary (Thompson) Frothingham. He attended school in Charlestown.

Journalistic career
Frothingham was a proprietor, and from 1852 to 1865, a managing editor of, The Boston Post.

Politics
He was a member of the Massachusetts state legislature in 1839, 1840, 1842, 1849, and 1850, and mayor of Charlestown from 1851 to 1853. Frothingham was a delegate to the 1852 Democratic National Convention.  During the 1852 election, Frothingham was an energetic supporter of Franklin Pierce for President. He was also a delegate to the 1876 Democratic National Convention.

Writings
He devoted much of his time to historical study, and published, in addition to many pamphlets,  magazine articles and addresses:
 History of Charlestown (1848)
 History of the siege of Boston, and of the battles of Lexington, Concord and Bunker Hill (1849)
 The Command in the Battle of Bunker Hill (1850)
 Life and Times of Joseph Warren (1865)
 Tribute to Thomas Starr King (1865)
 The Rise of the Republic of the United States, his most important work by some estimates (1871)
 The Centennial: Battle of Bunker Hill (1875)
For several years, he was treasurer of the Massachusetts Historical Society. In 1858, Frothingham was elected a member of the American Antiquarian Society.

Notes

1812 births
Mayors of Charlestown, Massachusetts
1852 United States presidential election
1876 United States presidential election
Members of the Massachusetts House of Representatives
19th-century American historians
1880 deaths
19th-century American journalists
American male journalists
Historians of the American Revolution
19th-century biographers
Members of the American Antiquarian Society
19th-century American politicians
19th-century American male writers
The Boston Post people